Allister Hutton (born 18 July 1954) is a former elite long-distance runner from Scotland, who won the London Marathon in 1990. He competed in three consecutive Commonwealth Games for Scotland during his career, starting in 1978.

Running for Edinburgh Southern Harriers (now incorporated into Edinburgh AC), Hutton was Scottish National Cross-country champion in 1978 and 1982.  He was third in the 1985 London Marathon, completing a British clean sweep behind Steve Jones and Charlie Spedding, and his time of 2:09:16 places him seventh on the UK all-time rankings.  He was third again in 1986.  Coached by Alan Storey, Hutton won the 1990 race (2:10:10), a clear thirty seconds ahead of the Italian Salvatore Bettiol.

Achievements

External links 
  History of the London Marathon
  Scottish National Cross-country Championships winners
 Power of 10 UK Marathon Rankings
 
  Edinburgh AC
 thecgf

1954 births
Living people
Scottish male marathon runners
Scottish male long-distance runners
Commonwealth Games competitors for Scotland
Athletes (track and field) at the 1978 Commonwealth Games
Athletes (track and field) at the 1982 Commonwealth Games
Athletes (track and field) at the 1986 Commonwealth Games
London Marathon male winners